Crooker may refer to:

 Mount Crooker, Antarctica
 Jim Crooker  (1926-2006), American golfer
 Kasson Crooker, American electronic musician
 Nancy Crooker (born 1944), American physicist
 Scott Crooker, research scientist at Los Alamos National Laboratory, United States

See also
 Crookers (duo), Italian electronic music duo
 W.D. Crooker House, Bath, Main, United States, on the National Register of Historic Places